Anthony George Coe (29 November 1934 – 16 March 2023) was an English jazz musician who played clarinet, bass clarinet, and flute as well as soprano, alto, and tenor saxophones.

Career
Born in Canterbury, Kent, England, Coe started out on clarinet and was self-taught on tenor saxophone. At just 15 years of age in 1949 he played in his school's (Simon Langton Grammar School for Boys) trad band and two years later, aged 17, became a full professional with Joe Daniels.  In 1953, aged 18, he joined the army where he played clarinet in the Military band and saxophone with the unit Dance Band.  After demob in 1955 he spent some time in France with the Micky Bryan Band (Micky on piano, Gerry Salisbury (valve trombone), Harry Bryan (trumpet), Lennie Hastings on drums, and Coe on clarinet), before rejoining Joe Daniels.   In 1957 Tony's father went to see Humphrey Lyttelton and, as a result, Tony spent just over four years with Humphrey's band from 1957 to the end of 1961.  This was a period when Coe was brought to the attention of critics and fans as well as giving him some degree of international fame.  He left Lyttleton at the end of 1961 to form his own outfit.

In 1965, Coe was invited to join Count Basie's band (later saying: "I'm glad it didn't come off – I would have lasted about a fortnight") and has since played with the John Dankworth Orchestra, the Kenny Clarke-Francy Boland Big Band, Derek Bailey's free improvisation group Company, Stan Tracey, Michael Gibbs, Stan Getz, Dizzy Gillespie, and Bob Brookmeyer, and performed under Pierre Boulez as well as leading a series of groups of his own, including Coe Oxley & Co with drummer Tony Oxley. He played clarinet on Paul McCartney's recording of "I'll Give You a Ring", released in 1982, and saxophone on John Martyn's 1973 album, Solid Air.

Coe also worked with the Matrix, a small ensemble formed by clarinettist Alan Hacker, with a wide-ranging repertoire of early, classical, and contemporary music, the Danish Radio Big Band, Metropole Orchestra and Skymasters in the Netherlands.  He has worked additionally with the Mike Gibbs big band and the United Jazz and Rock Ensemble.

Coe recorded on soundtracks for several films, including Superman II, Victor/Victoria, Nous irons tous au paradis, Leaving Las Vegas, Le Plus beau métier du monde and The Loss of Sexual Innocence. He also composed the film score for Camomille.

Coe, who lived in Canterbury, died on 16 March 2023, at the age of 88.

Awards and honours
In 1976, a grant from the Arts Council enabled him to write Zeitgeist - Based On Poems Of Jill Robin, a large-scale orchestral work fusing jazz and rock elements with techniques from classical music which was recorded on EMI records on 29 and 30 July 1976 at Lansdowne Studios based in Holland Park, London.  In 1995 he received an honorary degree and the Danish Jazzpar Prize.

Discography

As leader
 Swingin' Till the Girls Come Home with the Tony Coe Quintet (Philips, 1962)
 Tony's Basement with the Lansdowne String Quartet (Columbia, 1967)
 Sax with Sex (Metronome, 1968)
 Pop Makes Progress with Robert Farnon (Chapter One, 1970)
 With Brian Lemon Trio (77 Records, 1971)
 Zeitgeist: Based on Poems of Jill Robin (EMI, 1977)
 Coe-Existence (Lee Lambert, 1978)
 Time with Derek Bailey (Incus, 1979)
 Get It Together with Al Grey (Pizza Express, 1979)
 Tournée Du Chat (nato, 1983)
 Le Chat Se Retourne (nato, 1984)
 Mainly Mancini (Chabada, 1985)
 Alernate Cake (nato, 1985 - two tracks)
 Joyeux Noël with Norma Winstone (nato, 1987 - one track)
 Mer De Chine (nato, 1988)
 Canterbury Song (Hot House, 1989)
 Bandes originales du journal de Spirou (nato, 1989 - two tracks)
 Les Voix D'Itxassou (nato, 1990)
 Les Sources Bleues with Tony Hymas, Chris Laurence (nato, 1991)
 Les films de ma ville (nato, 1994 - one track)
 Captain Coe's Famous Racearound with Bob Brookmeyer (Storyville, 1996)
 Buenaventura Durruti with Tony Hymas, Beñat Achiary, Abel Paz (nato, 1996 - two tracks)
 In Concert with John Horler, Malcolm Creese (ABCDs, 1997)
 Jazz Piquant N'oublie Jamais with Tina May (Doz, 1998)
 Days of Wine and Roses with Alan Barnes (Zephyr, 1998)
 Street of Dreams with Warren Vaché (Zephyr, 1999)
 Jumpin with Warren Vaché, Alan Barnes (Zephyr, 1999)
 Sun, Moon, and Stars with Alan Hacker (Zah Zah, 1999)
 British-American Blue with Roger Kellaway (Between the Lines, 2000)
 Dreams with Gerard Presencer, Brian Lemon, Dave Green (Zephyr, 2001)
 What in the World with Richard Sinclair, David Rees Williams (Sinclair Songs, 2003)
 More Than You Know with Tina May, Nikki Iles (33 Records, 2004)

With the Melody Four 
(as co-leader with Steve Beresford and Lol Coxhill)
 Les Millions D'Arlequin / La Paloma  (Chabada, 1984)
 Love Plays Such Funny Games  (Chabada, 1984)
 The Melody Four? Si Señor!  (Chabada, 1985)
 Alernate Cake (nato, 1985 - one track)
 T.V.? Mais Oui!  (Chabada, 1986)
 Hello! We Must Be Going  (Chabada, 1987)
 Joyeux Noël with Norma Winstone (nato, 1987 - one track)
 Shopping For Melodies   (Chabada, 1988)
 Les films de ma ville (nato, 1994 - eight tracks)

With the Lonely Bears 
(as co-leader with Tony Hymas, Hugh Burns and Terry Bozzio)
 The Lonely Bears  (nato, 1991)
 Injustice  (nato, 1992)
 The Bears are running  (nato, 1994)

As sideman
With Steve Beresford
 1985: Eleven Songs for Doris Day (Chabada)
 1987: Kazuko Hohki chante Brigitte Bardot (Chabada)
 1988: L'Extraordinaire Jardin De Charles Trenet (Chabada)
 1989: Pentimento (Cinenato)
 1996: Cue Sheets (Tzadik)

With the Kenny Clarke/Francy Boland Big Band (MPS)
 1968: Latin Kaleidoscope (MPS)
 1968: All Smiles (MPS)
 1969: Faces (MPS)
 1969: All Blues (MPS)
 1969: Fellini 712 (MPS)
 1969: More Smiles (MPS)
 1969: At Her Majesty's Pleasure
 1969: Let's Face the Music and Dance
 1969: Live at Ronnie Scott's
 1969: Rue Chaptal
 1969: Volcano
 1971: Off Limits (Polydor)
 1971: Change of Scenes with Stan Getz (Verve)
 1971: Second Greatest Jazz Big Band in the World (Black Lion)
 1973: Big Band Sound of Kenny Clarke & Francy Boland
 1975: Open Door (Muse)
 1976: November Girl with Carmen McRae (Black Lion) 
 1976: Live at Ronnie Scotts (MPS)
 1988: Meets the Francy Boland Kenny Clark Big Band with Gitte Hænning (veraBra)
 1992: Clarke Boland Big Band en Concert avec Europe 1 (Tréma)
 1999: Our Kinda Strauss

With Georgie Fame
 1966: Sound Venture (Columbia)
 1967: The Two Faces of Fame (CBS)
 1968: The Third Face of Fame (CBS)

With Tony Hymas
 1988: Flying Fortress (nato)
 1990: Oyate (nato)
 1995: Remake of the American Dream (nato)

With Franz Koglmann
 1990: A White Line (hatART)
 1991: The Use of Memory (hatART)
 1991: L'Heure Bleue (hatART)
 1993: Cantos I-IV (hatART)
 1995: We Thought About Duke with Lee Konitz (hatART) 
 1998: Make Believe
 1999: An Affair With Strauss (Between the Lines)
 2001: Don't Play Just Be (Between the Lines)
 2001: O Moon My Pin-Up (hatOLOGY)
 2003: Fear Death by Water (Between the Lines)
 2005: Let's Make Love (Between the Lines)
 2009: Lo-Lee-Ta: Music on Nabokov

With Humphrey Lyttelton
 1957: Here's Humph! (Parlophone)
 1960: Blues in the Night (Columbia)
 1965: Humphrey Lyttelton and His Band 
 1971: Duke Ellington Classics (Black Lion)
 2001: The Humphrey Lyttelton Big Band with Jimmy Rushing
 2002: Humph Bruce & Sandy Swing at the BBC
 2003: A Night in Oxford Street
 2005: Humph Dedicates (Vocalion)
 2013: Live at the Nottingham Jazz Festival 1972 (Calligraph)

With Mike McGear
 1972: Woman
 1974: McGear (Warner Bros.)

With Norma Winstone
 1986: Somewhere Called Home
 1998: Manhattan in the Rain

With others
 1966: Black Marigolds, Michael Garrick (Argo)
 1969: Windmill Tilter: The Story of Don Quixote, John Dankworth/Kenny Wheeler
 1971: Mirrors, Benny Bailey (Freedom)
 1972: Bootleg Him!, Alexis Korner (Warner)
 1973: For Girls Who Grow Plump in the Night, Caravan (Deram)
 1973: Labyrinth, Nucleus
 1973: Nigel Lived, Murray Head
 1973: Solid Air, John Martyn
 1974: Krysia, Krysia Kocjan
 1974: Living on a Back Street, The Spencer Davis Group
 1974: The Road of Silk, Pete Atkin
 1975: Floresta Canto, Phil Woods
 1975: Only Chrome-Waterfall Orchestra, Mike Gibbs
 1976: Terminator, Nick Ingman
 1978: A Crazy Steal, The Hollies
 1978: Clark After Dark: The Ballad Album, Clark Terry
 1979: Harmony of the Spheres, Neil Ardley
 1982: Tug of War, Paul McCartney
 1983: Visit with the Great Spirit, Bob Moses
 1983: Poemas de Federico Garcia Lorca, Violeta Ferrer (nato)
 1984: Berlin Djungle, Peter Brötzmann
 1984: I'm Alright, Loudon Wainwright III
 1984: The Mystery of Man, Sarah Vaughan
 1988: Look at me, Terry Day (nato)
 1989: For Heaven's Sake, Benny Bailey
 1994: Jazz Tete a Tete, Tubby Hayes
 1994: R.S.V.P., Richard Sinclair
 1994: View from the Edge, Theo Travis
 1996: Cue Sheets, Steve Beresford (Tzadik)
 1998: N'Oublie Jamais, Tina May
 1998: Ridin' High: The British Sessions 1960–1971, Cleo Laine
 1999: Sun Moon & Stars, Alan Hacker
 2000: Where But for Caravan Would I?, Caravan
 2001: Easy to Remember, Joe Temperley
 2002: At the BBC Vol. 2: More Wireless Days, Chris Barber
 2002: In the Evening, Sandy Brown
 2002: Labyrinth, Ian Carr/Nucleus
 2002: Songs for Sandy, Digby Fairweather
 2002: Spectral Soprano, Lol Coxhill
 2003: Transformations, James Emery/Klangforum Wien/Emilio Pomárico
 2006: Dhammapada, John Mayer (composer)
 2006: Jazz Icons: Live in '58 & '70, Dizzy Gillespie
 2007: Dixie Band Stomp, Joe Daniels
 2008: Etudes/Radha Krishna, John Mayer (composer)
 2008: Harlem Airshaft: The Music of Duke Ellington, Alan Barnes
 2015: Crescendo in Duke, Benoit Delbecq (nato)
 2015: A Good Time Was Had By All, Danish Radio Big Band

References

External links
[ All Music Album Highlights]
 
 

1934 births
2023 deaths
21st-century British male musicians
21st-century clarinetists
21st-century saxophonists
Bebop clarinetists
Bebop saxophonists
British male jazz musicians
British male saxophonists
English jazz clarinetists
English jazz saxophonists
Hard bop clarinetists
Hard bop saxophonists
Incus Records artists
Kenny Clarke/Francy Boland Big Band members
Musicians from Kent
Nucleus (band) members
People educated at Simon Langton Grammar School for Boys
People from Canterbury
Post-bop clarinetists
Post-bop saxophonists
Storyville Records artists